MPM (2,5-dimethoxy-4-propoxyamphetamine) is a lesser-known psychedelic drug and a substituted amphetamine.

MPM was first synthesized by Alexander Shulgin. In his book PiHKAL, dosage is given as "30 mg or more" and duration "probably short". MPM is of low potency and produced only slight effects at the highest dose reported in PiHKAL of 30 mg, although its effects at higher doses than this have not been reported.

Very little data exists about the pharmacological properties, metabolism, and toxicity of MPM.

See also 

 Phenethylamines
 Psychedelics, dissociatives and deliriants

References 

Substituted amphetamines
Phenol ethers